Schistometopum gregorii, also known as Witu caecilian, mud-dwelling caecilian, and flood-plain-dwelling caecilian, is a species of amphibian in the family Dermophiidae from East Africa.

Distribution
Schistometopum gregorii is endemic to the coastal East Africa in Kenya and Tanzania; it is known from the Tana River Delta area in Kenya (its type locality) and between Bagamoyo and Rufiji River in Tanzania. It is possible that the Kenyan and Tanzanian populations are distinct species.

Etymology
The specific name gregorii honours John Walter Gregory, a British geologist and explorer and the collector of the holotype.

Description
Schistometopum gregorii is glossy black dorsolaterally and somewhat lighter ventrally. There are 110–119 primary annuli (ring-shaped folds). Kenyan males measure  (mean 247 mm) and females  (mean 260 mm) in total length.

Habitat and conservation
The species has been found from black mud near rivers and agricultural areas (e.g., rice paddies). There are no known major threats affecting this ecologically poorly known species. Because it occurs in cultivated areas it is likely able to tolerate disturbance.

References

gregorii
Taxa named by George Albert Boulenger
Amphibians described in 1895
Amphibians of Kenya
Amphibians of Tanzania
Taxonomy articles created by Polbot